Nurudeen Olawale Salau (born 4 April 1989) is a Nigerian footballer who plays as a forward for United Sikkim in the I-League.

Career

United Sikkim
After playing for Manang Marshyangdi in Nepal Nuruddin joined Tollygunge Agragami of the I-League 2nd Division and soon also joined Green Valley F.C. also of the I-League 2nd Division. After a stellar 2012 season for Green Valley, Nuruddin joined newly promoted United Sikkim F.C. of the I-League, Earlier during the season Salau scored a hat-trick against United Sikkim during the group phase of the I-League 2nd Division. Nuruddin then made his debut for United Sikkim on 24 September 2012 against Prayag United S.C. in the last match of United Sikkim's 2012 Indian Federation Cup run  in which they lost the first two matches and in which Salau could not play in due to paper work he needed to fill out.

References

1989 births
Nigerian footballers
Living people
Yoruba sportspeople
Manang Marshyangdi Club players
I-League players
United Sikkim F.C. players
Expatriate footballers in Nepal
Expatriate footballers in India
Nigerian expatriate footballers
Association football forwards
Tollygunge Agragami FC players